Dennis Michael Sullivan is an electrical engineer from the University of Idaho, Moscow. He was named a Fellow of the Institute of Electrical and Electronics Engineers (IEEE) in 2013 for his contributions to time domain electromagnetic simulation.

References

External links 

 Faculty profile at the University of Idaho

Fellow Members of the IEEE
Living people
Year of birth missing (living people)